Catherine of Austria (1295, Vienna, Austria – 18 January 1323, Naples) was a daughter of Albert I of Germany and his wife Elisabeth of Tirol. She was a member of the powerful House of Habsburg. She was Duchess of Calabria by her marriage.

Life 
Catherine was betrothed twice before she was married. Her first betrothal is referred to in the Turin State Archives to Philip I of Piedmont. Philip's first wife Isabella of Villehardouin had separated from him due to political reasons so Philip was free to remarry. However, the union between Catherine and Philip was dissolved. Philip instead married Catherine de la Tour du Pin.

Catherine may have been betrothed to someone from the Duchy of Brabant, possibly John II, Duke of Brabant. If this betrothal did take place, it was quickly dissolved by Catherine's brothers because their father had been murdered and had been succeeded by Henry of Luxembourg as Henry VII, Holy Roman Emperor. The brothers' plan was to marry off their sister to the Emperor in order to create an alliance with him. However, only one year after becoming emperor, Henry died without marrying Catherine.

Catherine was finally married aged twenty-one in 1316 to Charles, Duke of Calabria. However the marriage that Catherine and her family had waited for did not last for very long. The couple were married for seven childless years before Catherine died in Naples on 18 January 1323. She was buried in the church of San Lorenzo Maggiore, Naples.

After Catherine's death, Charles remarried to Marie of Valois, who became mother of Joanna I of Naples.

Ancestry

References 

1295 births
1323 deaths
14th-century Italian women
13th-century German women
14th-century House of Habsburg
Duchesses of Calabria
Daughters of kings